Arbedian (also Romanized as ‘Arbedīān and Arbīdīān) is a village in Dastjerd Rural District, Alamut-e Gharbi District, Qazvin County, Qazvin Province, Iran. At the 2006 census, its population was 60, in 15 families.

References 

Populated places in Qazvin County